The Ing Cup is an international Go tournament with a cash prize of over US$400,000. It was created by, and is named after, Ing Chang-ki. The tournament is held once every four years and hence often nicknamed the Go Olympics.

In the 7th Ing Cup, held in 2012/13, Fan Tingyu defeated Park Junghwan and became the youngest Ing Cup winner in history. In the semifinal, Fan defeated Xie He, and Park defeated Lee Chang-ho.

Overview
The Ing Cup is sponsored by Ing Chang-ki Weichi Educational Foundation, Yomiuri Shimbun, the Nihon-Kiin, and Kansai-Kiin, and is held every four years (and thus often nicknamed Go Olympics). The competition has its own special rules. The time allotment is three hours for each player, with no byoyomi; instead, players who run out of time pay a two-point penalty to receive an extra twenty minutes, and can receive extra time this way at most twice. The komi is 8 points, but Black wins ties. The first rounds are knockouts, while the semi-finals and finals are a best-of-three and best-of-five respectively.

Past winners and runners-up

The 9th Ing Cup has been significantly delayed, for reasons related to the COVID-19 pandemic. No date for final match has been announced, as of February 2023. The finalists are Shin Jin-seo and Xie Ke, who each advanced from the semifinals in January 2021.

By nation

References

External links
 Ing Cup games

 
1988 introductions